The Metropolitan Arts Centre, usually referred to as the MAC, is an arts venue in Belfast's Cathedral Quarter and is home to all kinds of exhibitions, theatre performances, experimental works.

The MAC is a cultural hub and a vital shared space in Belfast. Open 363 days per year, the MAC offers an eclectic programme of visual art, theatre, dance, family workshops and lots more. Since opening in 2012, some 1.5 million visitors have come through the doors of the MAC.

In 2015 the MAC was shortlisted for the Museum of the Year prize, with sponsor The Art Fund stating that “Belfast’s new arts venue presented an outstanding programme in 2014 and established itself as a world-class attraction”.

Architecture 

Designed by Belfast-based architectural practice Hackett Hall McKnight, the MAC sits on a roughly trapezium-shaped site opposite St Anne's Cathedral. The building, completed in February 2012, consists of a number of intersecting brick volumes and a basalt tower topped with three stories of glazing.

The project won a 2013 RIBA National Award and was awarded the 2014 Downes Medal by the Architectural Association of Ireland.

The Permanent Present 

The MAC has a single permanent artwork: The Permanent Present by Irish artist Mark Garry. The work was jointly commissioned by the MAC and The Thomas Devlin Fund, a charity set up in memory of murdered teenager Thomas Devlin, and consists of 400 copper strands in a spectrum of colours reaching from a high window down to the first floor. Anne McReynolds, Chief Executive of the MAC, said the aim was “to commission an artwork that would comment on The Thomas Devlin Fund’s commitment to highlighting the futility of violence as well as the hopes and aspirations of our young people”, and artist Mark Garry stated that he “wanted to create a work that is  positive and hopeful”.

References

External links 

 Official website
 Project architect’s website

Art museums established in 2012
Art museums and galleries in Northern Ireland
2012 establishments in Northern Ireland